{ "type": "ExternalData", "service": "page", "title": "Western Australian region - Mid West.map" }

The Mid West region is one of the nine regions of Western Australia.

Earlier names
The western portion of this region was known earlier as "The Murchison" based on the river of the same name, and the similarly named Goldfield.

Economy
The Mid West region has a diversified economy that varies with the geography and climate. Near the coast, annual rainfall of between  allows intensive agriculture. Geraldton is an important hub for the tourism industry. The Mid West also has the highest value fishing industry in Western Australia, with Geraldton the hub of the Western Rock Lobster industry. Western Rock Lobster netted almost $234.5 million in revenue for WA in the 2012–13 financial year, making it Australia's most valuable single-species wild capture fishery.

Gross Regional Product for the Mid West in 2013 was AU$6,000,000,000 (AU$6bn).

On 25 August 2015 The Hon. Terry Redman, MLA, Minister for Regional Development, launched the "Mid West Regional Blueprint";  an aspirational growth and development plan created by the Mid West Development Commission for the region.  The Blueprint proposes strategies against five priority pillars to drive or reduce barriers to, regional growth and development in the Mid West.  The Blueprint strategies are intended to focus on the region's key strengths and the identification of regional opportunities, providing a guide for regional development to 2050.

Space science

Square Kilometre Array
Due to its relative isolation from  radio-frequency interference, the Mid West region was selected to host one of two primary radiotelescope locations of the Square Kilometre Array (SKA) project. When fully operational in 2024, this AU$2bn project will be 50 times more sensitive than any existing radio interferometer instrument; it will generate more data than the current global Internet traffic and be capable of surveying the sky more than ten thousand to a million times faster than what is possible today. The radiotelescope antennae and the Murchison Radio-astronomy Observatory (MRO) are located near Boolardy, Western Australia, approximately 315 km northeast of Geraldton, with logistics and science support provided by CSIRO from their facilities in Geraldton. High-capacity optical fibre cables connect the SKA telescope to the MRO support facility in Geraldton and to the Pawsley Supercomputing Centre in Perth, Western Australia.

WA Space Centre

Located at Yatharagga, 40 km from Mingenew (100 km SE of Geraldton), the WA Space Centre is an $8,000,000 114 ha satellite park owned and operated by Space Australia, a subsidiary company of the Swedish Space Corporation (SSC). The park is located in one of several Radio Quiet Zones in the region, making it an ideal location for radioastronomy. The SSC is the largest commercial operator of satellite tracking ground station facilities. The facilities include compounds operated by NASA, The European Space Agency, CSIRO, MOBLAS and VLBI, amongst others.

Local government
The local government areas in the Mid West region are Carnamah, Chapman Valley, Coorow, Cue, Greater Geraldton, Irwin, Meekatharra, Mingenew, Morawa, Mount Magnet, Murchison, Northampton, Perenjori, Sandstone, Three Springs and Yalgoo. In 1 June 2021 Shire of Wiluna officially joined Goldfields-Esperance region.

Conservation reserves
The allocated land includes portions of two former pastoral leases, Lakeside and Burnerbinmah, as well as Crown land at Kirkalocka and White Wells. There are many significant Aboriginal sites of significance as well as other historic sites within the new parks.

See also

 Regions of Western Australia

References

External links

 Mid West Development Commission
Yamatji Marlpa Barna Baba Maaja Aboriginal Corporation , the Native Title Representative Body incorporating the Yamatji Land and Sea Council

 
Regions of Western Australia
Agriculture in Western Australia